HMS Preston was a 50-gun fourth rate ship of the line of the Royal Navy, built at Deptford Dockyard by Adam Hayes to the draught specified in the 1745 Establishment, and launched on 7 February 1757.

Service History
From May until October 1769 she was under command of Captain Basil Keith.

From January 1774 until April 1776 she was under command of Captain John Robinson with a crew of 350 men. Cuthbert Collingwood was a midshipman on the ship during this period.

She took part in the Naval operations in the American Revolutionary War under William Hotham. On 13 August 1778, cut off from her squadron by a storm, she encountered the French 74-gun Marseillois, which she fought indecisively.

Taking part in the Battle of Dogger Bank (1781) where she was disabled, with her commander, Captain Alexander Graeme losing an arm, she was sailed back to the Thames by Lieutenant Saumarez

From March 1783 until April 1784 she was under command of Captain George Martin.

In 1785, Preston was converted to serve as a sheer hulk, and she was eventually broken up at Woolwich in January 1815.

Notes

References

Lavery, Brian (2003) The Ship of the Line – Volume 1: The development of the battlefleet 1650–1850. Conway Maritime Press. .

Ships of the line of the Royal Navy
1757 ships